Paul Braunstein is a Canadian actor who starred in the popular Canadian television series Train 48 in 2003 as Johnny McLaughlin, a comical character. He was considered one of the most popular cast members of the series and has also made a few other appearances on television and film. He appeared as Griggs in the 2011 horror film The Thing as well as the 2017 horror film Jigsaw. Braunstein also acted in theatre productions.

Filmography

Film

Television

References

External links

Year of birth missing (living people)
Living people
Canadian male voice actors
Canadian male film actors
Place of birth missing (living people)
Canadian male television actors